At the 1962 Commonwealth Paraplegic Games in Perth, Western Australia eighty nine athletes from nine countries competed in fourteen events.

Medals by Events

Archery
The FITA Round for Gentlemen consists of 36 arrows from each of the following distances – at 90, 70, 50, and 30 metres. FITA Round for Ladies consists of 36 arrows from each of the following distances – 70, 60, 50 and 30 metres. Windsor Round consists of 36 arrows at 60, 50, 40 yards. Columbia Round consists of 24 arrows at 50, 40, 30 yards. St Nicholas Round consists of 48 arrows at 40 yards and 36 arrows at 30 yards.

Dartchery

Dartchery is a combination of darts and archery.

Javelin Throw

Classification: Class A – paralysed above segment T10 – complete paralysis ; Class B – paralysed above segment T10 – incomplete paralysis ; Class C – paralysed below segment T10 ; Class D – cauda equina with functioning thigh muscles.

Precision Javelin
Precision javelin involved throwing a javelin on a target on the ground. Classification: Class A – paralysed above segment T10 – complete paralysis ; Class B – paralysed above segment T10 – incomplete paralysis ; Class C – paralysed below segment T10 ; Class D – cauda equina with functioning thigh muscles) .

Club Throw
Club throw involved throwing a wooden object in the form of a club. Classification: Class A – paralysed above segment T10 – complete paralysis; Class B – paralysed above segment T10 – incomplete paralysis; Class C – paralysed below segment T10; Class D – cauda equina with functioning thigh muscles.

Shot Put
Classification: Class A – paralysed above segment T10 – complete paralysis; Class B – paralysed above segment T10 – incomplete paralysis; Class C – paralysed below segment T10; Class D – cauda equina with functioning thigh muscles.

Swimming
Swimming events took place in the Beatty Park Pool that was built for the main Games.  It was the only event not held at the Showgrounds and therefore posed transport problems for the organisers. This was overcome through volunteer drivers and their cars. Classes for swimming  – Class A – paralysed from C8 to T6 segment, Class B – paralysed from T7 to T10 segment – complete paralysis, Class C – paralysed from T7 to T10 segment – incomplete paralysis, Class D – paralysed from T11 to L2 segment and Class E (Caudia equina).
5,500 spectators including Hon. David Brand, Premier of Western Australia attended the second (and final) day of swimming at the Beatty Park Pool. The events were interspersed by swimming and diving demonstrations by members of the Australian British Empire Games team including Murray Rose, Dawn Fraser and David Dickson.

There was also a demonstration by the Western Australian water polo team.

No medal refers to insufficient competitors.

Weightlifting
This event involved a standard supine press. There were four classes: heavyweight (above 12 stone), middleweight (between 10 and 12 stone), lightweight (between 8 and 10 stone) and featherweight (under 8 stone). Athletes from sports such as table tennis, fencing, throwing events, and swimming decided to enter this event. Vic Renaldson, an Australian athlete in the heavyweight division, set a new paraplegic world record.

Pentathlon
Pentathlon consisted of five events: javelin throw, club throw, shot put, archery and swimming (50 m crawl).

Fencing

Snooker

Scores: 60–56 ; 51–27

Basketball

Basketball had an exciting series of matches and these were played in front of large crowds particularly as the opening and final matches were associated with the series.  Several games were played under floodlight. It was noted that the English team used four-wheel chairs and the ns three-wheeled sports chairs. The Australian team made up of primarily Western Australians went on to win the gold medal.

Scores: Australia 20 d England 18 ; Australia 36 v Scotland 6 ; England 18 v Scotland 7 ; Australia 24 v England 16; Australia 34 v Scotland 10; England 24 v Scotland 15

The results do not list the athletes in the teams but the programme listed nominated athletes for basketball. There were 5 athletes per team.
Australia – Frank Ponta, Roger Cockerill, Kevin Cunningham, John Turich, Bill Mather-Brown, Chris O'Brien, D. Tinsley, Bruni Moretti, J. Gidney, R. Maxwell
England – R. Foster, T. Moran, J. Chilcott, K. Edwards, J. Gibson, Dick Thompson, J. Thompson, T. Palmer, R. Scott
Scotland – T. Guthrie, N. Macdonald, J. Robertson, J.G. Robertson, J. Sloway, P. Stanton, J. Whitefield, A. Shields

Table Tennis

References 

Commonwealth Paraplegic Games